This is a list of the Denmark national football team results from 1908 to 1929.

The Denmark national team was officially created in 1908, however, the first appearance of a Danish national team was at the 1896 Summer Olympics in Athens, where a Denmark XI beat a Greece XI, either 9–0 or 15–0, at the Neo Phaliron Velodrome in a demonstration game. Denmark also participated in the 1906 Intercalated Games also in Athens, with a team compiled of players from the Copenhagen Football Association (KBU), and they won the event after again beating Greece with a heavy score (9–0), and thereby winning an unofficial gold medal.

Between their first official match in 1908 and 1929, Denmark played 73 games. Throughout this period they played in three Olympic football tournaments in 1908, 1912 and 1920, reaching the final on the former two, which they lost to Great Britain on both occasions. In the 1908 semi-finals they beat France 17-1 with 10 goals from Sophus Nielsen.

They also played the inaugural edition of the Nordic Football Championship in 1924-28, winning the tournament.

1890s

1896 Olympic Games

1900s

1906 Intercalated Games

1908 Olympic Games

1910s

1910

Denmark became the first team in 4 years to beat England Amateurs's, which didn't go well for the English, so a second match was scheduled for 7 May, however, King Edward VII died on 6 May and the officials asked for a postponement for 9 May, but after heavy rain over Copenhagen, the English referee, Jackie Pearson, called the match off, thus killing the chances for revenge.

1911

1912

1913

1914

1915

1916

1917

1918

1919

1920s

1920

1921

1922

1923

1924

1925

1926

1927

1928

1929

References

External links 
 DENMARK - Overview of Official Internationals

1900s
1900s in Denmark
1910s in Denmark
1920s in Denmark